Future Man is an American comedy streaming television series created by Howard Overman, Kyle Hunter and Ariel Shaffir that premiered on November 14, 2017 on Hulu. The series follows an underachieving janitor who is called upon to save the world. It stars Josh Hutcherson, Eliza Coupe, Derek Wilson, Ed Begley Jr., Glenne Headly, Seth Rogen and Haley Joel Osment in recurring roles and is executive produced by Seth Rogen and Evan Goldberg. A third and final season was released on April 3, 2020.

Premise
A janitor, Josh Futturman, successfully completes his favorite video game (that was considered unbeatable), Biotic Wars, when suddenly the game's two main characters, Tiger and Wolf, appear and recruit Josh to save the world from the real Biotic Wars. Josh and his companions travel through time to change the future.

Cast and characters
The following is a list of series regulars, recurring and guest stars from Future Man.

Main
 Josh Hutcherson as Joshua Sasha "Josh" Futterman, a research facility janitor and the first person to complete the video game Biotic Wars. Hutcherson also portrays an alternate timeline version Josh known as Joosh "J-Futz" Futturman in the first season, another (cloned) version called J-26 in the second season, and a third version, a parallel version of the main Josh who becomes known as "Nut-Face" Josh Futterman / J-1, in the second and third seasons. At the conclusion of the series finale "Return of the Present", the "real" Josh is revealed to have been Black, with Josh Hutcherson having starred as Josh in a whitewashed television series adaptation of their lives.
 Eliza Coupe as Tiger, a soldier from the distant future who travels back in time to recruit Josh into aiding their mission to prevent a deadly war from occurring. Coupe also portrays an alternate timeline version of Tiger known as Ty-Anne Camillo / Achilles, the adoptive daughter of Dr. Stu Camillo and leader of the resistance, in the second season. At the conclusion of the series finale "Return of the Present", the "real" Tiger is revealed to have been Asian, with Eliza Coupe] having starred as Tiger in a whitewashed television series adaptation of their lives.
 Derek Wilson as Wolf / Corey Wolf-Hart (Wolfhart), a comrade of Tiger's from the distant future who joins her in attempting to recruit Josh. Wilson also portrays an alternate timeline version of Wolf known as Torque Wheelmaker in the second season. At the conclusion of the series finale "Return of the Present", the "real" Wolf is revealed to have been Black, with Derek Wilson having starred as Wolf in a whitewashed television series adaptation of their lives.
 Ed Begley, Jr. as Gabe Futturman (season 1), Josh's father. James Austin Johnson portrays a young Gabe in the first and third seasons.
 Glenne Headly as Diane Futturman (season 1), Josh's mother. Gwen Hollander portrays a young Diane in the first and third seasons.
 Keith David as Doctor Elias Kronish (season 1), a scientist whose research is responsible for the eventual creation of the Biotics. Cedric Sanders portrays a young Kronish.
 Haley Joel Osment as Doctor Stu Camillo (season 2; recurring season 1), a scientist initially working with/for Kronish in the first season, an alternate reality version of whose reverse-engineering of Tiger's hair is responsible for the eventual creation of the Bio-Techs, before eventually transferring existence into one of an artificial intelligence (AI), ruling over humanity.
 Seth Rogen as Susan Saint Jackalope (season 3; guest season 2), the showrunner of "The DieCathalon", a The Running Man-inspired death game, run by the villainous "network" in 3491, initially seeking to retrieve Wolf, Tiger, and Josh to pay for his robotic family before .
 Laurent Pitre as Tim "Big Time" Kilvitis / Big Times (season 3), a college student and accidental creator of Haven, the utopia and existential netherworld responsible for time travel, existing outside the universe, in which resides an infinite version of him, "Big Times", a democratic cooperative of like-minded consciousnesses peacefully sharing his hoodie, which he is the "door".

Recurring

 Jason Scott Jenkins as Carl (season 1)
 Robert Craighead as Vincent Skarsgaard (season 1; guest season 2), a police officer pursuing Tiger and Wolf for the murder of his partner in the first season.
 Britt Lower as Geraldine "Jeri" Lang (season 1; guest season 2), an undercover Biotic and work colleague of Josh's in the first season, and a Bio-Tech and member of Achilles' resistance in the second season.
 Kevin Caliber as Blaze (season 1)
 Paul Scheer as Paul (season 1; guest season 2)
 Awkwafina as Tracy (season 1)
 Katherine LaNasa as Doctor Eunice Hogeveen / Athena (season 2), the founder of the Resistance and nanny of Ty-Anne.
 Artemis Pebdani as Doctor Mina Ahmadi (season 2), an AI aspect of Stu who serves as his therapist.
 Ricky Mabe as Pump (season 2)
 Shaun Brown as Hatchet (season 2)
 Sara Amini as Thimble (season 2)
 Rati Gupta as Rake (season 2)
 Tim Johnson Jr. as Jimmy (season 2)
 Jade Catta-Preta as Level (season 2)
 Timothy Hornor as Lathe (season 2)
 Kimberly Hébert Gregory as Mathers (season 3), a natural-born single-minded bureaucrat hunting Wolf, Tiger, and Josh on behalf of the villainous network.
 Nicolas Grimes as The Killing Machine (season 3), a cyborg clone of the 300 Spartans hunting Wolf, Tiger, and Josh.
 Fajer Al-Kaisi as Osama bin Laden / OBL (season 3), an atheist version of the real-life terrorist from an alternate reality where he was prevented from becoming one.
 Nick Wyman as Abraham Lincoln (season 3), a resident of Haven and former President of the United States rescued from death by J1.
 Holly Deveaux as Norma Jeane Mortenson / Marilyn Monroe (season 3), a resident of Haven rescued from death by J1, former actress, and a love interest of Josh's.
 Paul Zinno as James Dean (season 3), a resident of Haven and former cultural icon actor rescued from death by J1, and a love interest of Josh's.
 Josh Cruddas as Vincent van Gogh (season 3), a resident of Haven and former painter rescued from death by J1.
 Christopher Tramantana as Jesus Christ (season 3), a resident of Haven and the son of God, rescued from death by J1, and a love interest of Josh's.
 Kannan Menon as Gandhi (season 3), a resident of Haven and former nonviolent resistance rescued from death by J1, and a love interest of Josh's.
 Carlisle J. Williams as Martin Luther King Jr. / MLK (season 3), a resident of Haven and former nonviolent resistance rescued from death by J1, and a love interest of Josh's.
 Massimo Diem as Buddy Holly (season 3), a resident of Haven and former cultural icon rescued from death by J1.

Guest

 Ron Funches as Ray ("Pilot")
 Martin Starr as Lyle Karofsky ("A Fuel's Errand")
 David Koechner as Barry Futturman ("A Blowjob Before Dying")
 Carolyn Hennesy as Wanda ("A Blowjob Before Dying")
 Megan Hayes as the voice of SIGORN-E ("Pandora's Mailbox")
 Charlie McDermott as young Barry Futturman ("Operation: Natal Attraction")
 Diona Reasonover as Estelle Kronish (seasons 1–2; "Beyond the TruffleDome" and "The Last Horchata")
 Corey Hart as himself ("Prelude to an Apocalypse")
 Carla Gallo as Dingo ("A Date with Destiny")
 Jon Daly as Owl ("A Date with Destiny")
 Will Forte as the voice of CASSIN-E ("The i of the Tiger")
 Kristen Schaal as Screw ("Guess Who's Coming to Lunch")
 Kurtwood Smith as Supreme Overlord General Vise Myrmbeater ("The Binx Ultimatum")
 Laura Baranik as Dasha Ovechkin ("There Will Be Borscht")
 Ami Bejko as Anne Frank ("Haven Is for Real"), a resident of Haven and Jewish teenager saved from Nazis by J1.
 Chala Hunter as Amelia Earhart ("The Land After Time"), a resident of Haven and former pilot rescued from death by J1, and a love interest of Josh's.
 Chris Mark as Bruce Lee ("The Land After Time"), a resident of Haven and former martial artist and actor rescued from death by J1, and a love interest of Josh's.

Episodes

Season 1 (2017)

Season 2 (2019)

Season 3 (2020)

Production

Development
On September 9, 2016, it was announced that Hulu had ordered the production to series after reviewing the recently produced pilot. The series order was reported to be for a first season consisting of thirteen episodes. The pilot was written by Ariel Shaffir and Kyle Hunter from a story by the duo and Howard Overman and was directed by Seth Rogen and Evan Goldberg. The series' executive producers include Shaffir, Hunter, Rogen, Goldberg and James Weaver. On January 8, 2018, it was announced that Hulu had renewed the series for a second season consisting of thirteen episodes. On October 1, 2018, it was announced that the second season would premiere on January 11, 2019. On April 9, 2019, it was reported that Hulu renewed the series for a third and final season which premiered on April 3, 2020.

Casting
On February 17, 2016, it was announced that Josh Hutcherson had been cast in the television pilot's lead role. A week later, it was reported that Eliza Coupe had also been cast in a main role. On March 7, 2016, it was announced that Glenne Headly and Ed Begley Jr. had joined the main cast as Hutcherson's character's parents. On May 2, 2016, Derek Wilson joined the production in a main role. In April 2017, it was reported that Patrick Carlyle and Robert Craighead had been cast in recurring roles.

On June 28, 2018, it was announced that Shaun Brown had joined the cast in a recurring capacity. On July 17, 2018, it was reported that Sara Amini and Rati Gupta had been cast in recurring roles. In August 2018, it was announced that Tim Johnson Jr., Jade Catta-Preta and Timothy Hornor had also been cast in recurring roles.

Filming
On June 8, 2017, cast member Glenne Headly died after she filmed five episodes of the planned 13-episode season order. Producers stated that she would not be recast and that the episodes she filmed will air, leaving the writers with the need to rework the episodes she was due to feature in.

Release
In the US Future Man streams on Hulu. As of 2022, Future Man is available to stream on Disney+ internationally in selected territories via the Star hub. It streams there as part of the 2021 Disney/Sony deal which covers shows from Sony Pictures Television.

Reception
On Rotten Tomatoes, season 1 has an approval rating of 82% based on 39 reviews, with an average rating of 7.08 out of 10. The website's critical consensus reads, "Future Mans nostalgia-driven premise is elevated by the cast's compelling chemistry and a sense of humor just dumb enough to lighten the sci-fi load." On Metacritic season 1 has a weighted average score of 70 out of 100 based on reviews from 20 critics, indicating "generally favorable reviews".  
Alex McLevy of The A.V. Club praises the committed performances, the "gleefully ludicrous nonsense", and that "If it figures out the proper tone and blend of stupid-smart jokes with its game cast, the series could potentially travel forward to a time when it becomes a great sci-fi comedy."

On Rotten Tomatoes, season 2 has an approval rating of 100% based on 9 reviews, with an average rating of 8.03 out of 10.
Adam Chitwood of Collider.com wrote: "Future Man's strength as a series has been the writers' willingness to take the sci-fi seriously, and indeed there are times when you almost want the joke to be done so you can find out what happens next in the story."

On Rotten Tomatoes, season 3 has 3 positive reviews.
Alex McLevy of The A.V. Club wrote: "Future Man finds a decent denouement to close out its triptych of seasons, and those who enjoyed past installments won’t be let down by this one. If only all that traveling through space and time could have found a more richly developed series."
Adam Chitwood of Collider.com called it "A little disappointing but not inessential" and that although it will not convince those who never got into the show to check it out, it should satisfy fans of the series.

Awards and nominations
In 2018 Future Man was nominated for Best New Media Superhero Series	at the 44th Saturn Awards

Home media

See also
 List of original programs distributed by Hulu
 Action comedy TV series

References

External links
 
 

2010s American comic science fiction television series
2017 American television series debuts
2020 American television series endings
English-language television shows
Hulu original programming
Television series by Sony Pictures Television